John Devereux  was a 16th-century religious leader in Ireland. to 1555

He was Dean of Ferns from 1559 to 1569 (the last three years in commendam); and Bishop of Ferns from 1566 until his death in 1578.

References

16th-century Anglican bishops in Ireland
Bishops of Ferns
Deans of Ferns